Eureka Aerodrome  is located at Eureka, Nunavut, Canada, and is operated by Environment Canada.

References

External links
 

Ellesmere Island
Registered aerodromes in the Qikiqtaaluk Region